Seduction is the third album by jazz saxophonist Boney James, released in 1995.

Track listing

Personnel 
Musicians
 Boney James – all other instruments except where noted, alto saxophone (1, 2), wind synthesizer (1, 9), keyboards (2, 6, 8, 9), tenor saxophone (3, 5-8), soprano saxophone (4, 6, 9), synth bass (5, 9), Minimoog (7)
 Michael Egizi – keyboards (1, 4)
 David Torkanowsky – keyboards (2, 6, 9), acoustic piano (6)
 Darrell Smith – keyboards (3, 7), acoustic piano (8)
 Leon Bisquera – keyboards (5)
 Bob James – acoustic piano (5)
 Eric Cadieux – Pro Tools programming (6)
 Tony Maiden – guitars (1)
 Paul Jackson Jr. – guitars (2-5, 9), guitar solo (2)
 Carl Burnett – Wah Wah guitar (2)
 A. Ray Fuller – guitars (6, 7)
 Marcos Loya – guitars (8), jarana candelas (8)
 Me'Shell NdegéOcello – bass (2)
 Dwayne "Smitty" Smith – synth bass (6)
 Roberto Vally – bass (8), electric bass (9)
 Donnell Spencer Jr. – drums (6)
 Lenny Castro – percussion (1-6, 8, 9)
 Peter Erskine – cymbals (5), drums (8)
 Paul Brown – handclaps (9)
 Dan Higgins – tenor saxophone (3)
 Bill Reichenbach Jr. – trombone (3)
 Jerry Hey – trumpet (3), flugelhorn (3)
 Rick Braun – flugelhorn (8)
 Daddy Shakespeare – vocals (2)
 Roy Galloway – backing vocals (7)
 Jeff Pescetto – backing vocals (7)
 Leslie Smith – backing vocals (7)

Arrangements
 Michael Egizi (1, 4)
 Carl Burnett (2)
 Darrell Smith (3, 7)
 Jerry Hey – horn arrangements (3)
 Leon Bisquera (5)
 Paul Brown (5-9)
 Boney James (5-9)

Production 
 Paul Brown – producer, recording, mixing 
 Rob Seilert – additional engineer 
 Scott Burns – assistant engineer 
 Teresa Callin – assistant engineer 
 Dave Huron – assistant engineer 
 Fred Kelly – assistant engineer 
 Liz Magro – assistant engineer 
 Charles Nasser – assistant engineer 
 Terri Wong – assistant engineer 
 Stephen Marcussen – mastering at Precision Mastering (Hollywood, California)
 Lexy Brewer – production coordinator 
 Larry Vigon – art direction, design 
 Brian Jackson – design 
 Taek Jun – photography 
 Alison Reynolds – photography, hair stylist, make-up 
 Howard Lowell – management

References

1995 albums
Boney James albums
Warner Records albums